The big red bat (Aeorestes egregius) is a species of vesper bat from South and Central America.

Taxonomy
It was described as a new species in 1870 by German naturalist Wilhelm Peters. Peters placed it in the now-defunct genus Atalpha, with a binomial of Atalpha egregia. The holotype was collected in the Brazilian state of Santa Catarina by Hermann Burmeister.

Description
It has black flight membranes and its fur is a consistent shade of red over its entire body.

Range and habitat
The big red bat is found in Central and South America. Its range includes Panama, Brazil, French Guiana, and Suriname. In 1998, the species was documented in Honduras for the first time. This marked a  extension of the species' range from the previously known northern limit.

Conservation
This species is infrequently encountered. The capture of two individuals in Honduras in 1998 marked the fifth and sixth individuals ever documented. Due to the lack of information on its ecology, geographic extent, population size, and threats it faces, the IUCN lists this species as data deficient as of 2016.

References

External links
Image of a specimen collected in Suriname

Lasiurini
Bats of South America
Bats of Brazil
Mammals described in 1870
Taxa named by Wilhelm Peters
Bats of Central America
Mammals of Suriname
Mammals of French Guiana